Giáp Bát station is a railway station on the North–South railway (Reunification Express) in Vietnam. It serves the city of Hanoi.

References

Railway stations in Hanoi